Eupithecia albigrisata is a moth in the family Geometridae. It is found in West Virginia and Georgia.

References

Moths described in 1909
albigrisata
Moths of North America